The monument to Mendizábal was an instance of public art in Madrid, Spain. Located in the Plaza del Progreso, it consisted of a bronze statue of Juan Álvarez Mendizábal, architect of the Liberal reforms in Spain in the 1830s, and a stone pedestal. It was removed in 1939.

History and description 

It arrived to Madrid in 1857. Following a series of delays regarding the indecision on the location of the monument, works to install it in the Plaza del Progreso started in 1868. The monument was unveiled on 6 June 1869, during a ceremony attended by the General Serrano and a small boy, grandson of Mendizábal.

The politician wore a levite, pants and a gilet, with his left hand performing the hand-in-waistcoat pose. The prismatic plinth was an austere work lacking in ornamental details and it reportedly lacked an inscription referencing the name of the politician until 1904.

Following the entry of the Francoist troops in Madrid in 1939 towards the end of Spanish Civil War, the monument was toppled from its location. The bronze may have been recast in another monument. The plaza del Progreso was renamed as "Plaza de Tirso de Molina" and a sculpture of the later figure replaced the original monument in 1943.

References 
Citations

Bibliography
 
 
 

Removed statues
Outdoor sculptures in Madrid
Bronze sculptures in Spain
Sculptures of men in Spain
Monuments and memorials in Madrid
Statues of politicians